Mechanical resonance is the tendency of a mechanical system to respond at greater amplitude when the frequency of its oscillations matches the system's natural frequency of vibration (its resonance frequency or resonant frequency) closer than it does other frequencies. It may cause violent swaying motions and potentially catastrophic failure in improperly constructed structures including bridges, buildings and airplanes. This is a phenomenon known as resonance disaster.

Avoiding resonance disasters is a major concern in every building, tower and bridge construction project. The Taipei 101 building relies on a 660-ton pendulum—a tuned mass damper—to modify the response at resonance. Furthermore, the structure is designed to resonate at a frequency which does not typically occur. Buildings in seismic zones are often constructed to take into account the oscillating frequencies of expected ground motion. In addition, engineers designing objects having engines must ensure that the mechanical resonant frequencies of the component parts do not match driving vibrational frequencies of the motors or other strongly oscillating parts.

Many resonant objects have more than one resonance frequency. It will vibrate easily at those frequencies, and less so at other frequencies. Many clocks keep time by mechanical resonance in a balance wheel, pendulum, or quartz crystal.

Description
The natural frequency of a simple mechanical system consisting of a weight suspended by a spring is:

where m is the mass and k is the spring constant.

A swing set is a simple example of a resonant system with which most people have practical experience. It is a form of pendulum. If the system is excited (pushed) with a period between pushes equal to the inverse of the pendulum's natural frequency, the swing will swing higher and higher, but if excited at a different frequency, it will be difficult to move. The resonance frequency of a pendulum, the only frequency at which it will vibrate, is given approximately, for small displacements, by the equation:

where g is the acceleration due to gravity (about 9.8 m/s2 near the surface of Earth), and L is the length from the pivot point to the center of mass. (An elliptic integral yields a description for any displacement). Note that, in this approximation, the frequency does not depend on mass.

Mechanical resonators work by transferring energy repeatedly from kinetic to potential form and back again. In the pendulum, for example, all the energy is stored as gravitational energy (a form of potential energy) when the bob is instantaneously motionless at the top of its swing. This energy is proportional to both the mass of the bob and its height above the lowest point. As the bob descends and picks up speed, its potential energy is gradually converted to kinetic energy (energy of movement), which is proportional to the bob's mass and to the square of its speed. When the bob is at the bottom of its travel, it has maximum kinetic energy and minimum potential energy. The same process then happens in reverse as the bob climbs towards the top of its swing.

Some resonant objects have more than one resonance frequency, particularly at harmonics (multiples) of the strongest resonance. It will vibrate easily at those frequencies, and less so at other frequencies. It will "pick out" its resonance frequency from a complex excitation, such as an impulse or a wideband noise excitation. In effect, it is filtering out all frequencies other than its resonance. In the example above, the swing cannot easily be excited by harmonic frequencies, but can be excited by subharmonics.

Examples

Various examples of mechanical resonance include:
Musical instruments (acoustic resonance).
Most clocks keep time by mechanical resonance in a balance wheel, pendulum, or quartz crystal.
Tidal resonance of the Bay of Fundy.
Orbital resonance as in some moons of the Solar System's gas giants.
The resonance of the basilar membrane in the ear.
A wineglass breaking when someone sings a loud note at exactly the right pitch.

Resonance may cause violent swaying motions in constructed structures, such as bridges and buildings. The London Millennium Footbridge (nicknamed the Wobbly Bridge) exhibited this problem. A faulty bridge can even be destroyed by its resonance (see Broughton Suspension Bridge and Angers Bridge). Mechanical systems store potential energy in different forms. For example, a spring/mass system stores energy as tension in the spring, which is ultimately stored as the energy of bonds between atoms.

Resonance disaster

In mechanics and construction a resonance disaster describes the destruction of a building or a technical mechanism by induced vibrations at a system's resonance frequency, which causes it to oscillate. Periodic excitation optimally transfers to the system the energy of the vibration and stores it there. Because of this repeated storage and additional energy input the system swings ever more strongly, until its load limit is exceeded.

Tacoma Narrows Bridge

The dramatic, rhythmic twisting that resulted in the 1940 collapse of "Galloping Gertie", the original Tacoma Narrows Bridge, is sometimes characterized in physics textbooks as a classic example of resonance. The catastrophic vibrations that destroyed the bridge were due to an oscillation caused by interactions between the bridge and the winds passing through its structure—a phenomenon known as aeroelastic flutter. Robert H. Scanlan, father of the field of bridge aerodynamics, wrote an article about this.

Other examples
 Collapse of Broughton Suspension Bridge (due to soldiers walking in step)
 Collapse of Angers Bridge
 Collapse of Königs Wusterhausen Central Tower
 Resonance of the Millennium Bridge

Applications
Various method of inducing mechanical resonance in a medium exist. Mechanical waves can be generated in a medium by subjecting an electromechanical element to an alternating electric field having a frequency which induces mechanical resonance and is below any electrical resonance frequency. Such devices can apply mechanical energy from an external source to an element to mechanically stress the element or apply mechanical energy produced by the element to an external load.

The United States Patent Office classifies devices that tests mechanical resonance under subclass 579, resonance, frequency, or amplitude study, of Class 73, Measuring and testing. This subclass is itself indented under subclass 570, Vibration. Such devices test an article or mechanism by subjecting it to a vibratory force for determining qualities, characteristics, or conditions thereof, or sensing, studying or making analysis of the vibrations otherwise generated in or existing in the article or mechanism. Devices include right methods to cause vibrations at a natural mechanical resonance and measure the frequency and/or amplitude the resonance made. Various devices study the amplitude response over a frequency range is made. This includes nodal points, wave lengths, and standing wave characteristics measured under predetermined vibration conditions.

See also 

 Dunkerley's method
 Electrical resonance
 List of laser applications
 Mechanical filter
 Reed switch
 Resonator
 Sympathetic resonance
 Transducer

Notes

Further reading 

 S Spinner, WE Tefft, A method for determining mechanical resonance frequencies and for calculating elastic moduli from these frequencies. American Society for testing and materials.
 CC Jones, A mechanical resonance apparatus for undergraduate laboratories. American Journal of Physics, 1995.

Patents 

  Method and apparatus for inspecting materials
  Apparatus for testing textiles
  Apparatus for testing textiles and like materials
  Testing and adjusting device
  Method and apparatus for testing materials
  Article testing machine
  Apparatus for determining the behavior of suspended cables
  Mechanical resonance detection systems
  Vibrating-blade relays with electro-mechanical resonance
  Quantum mechanical resonance devices
  Mechanical resonance indicator
  Piezoelectric resonance device
  Tuned ground motion detector utilizing principles of mechanical resonance
  Apparatus and method for generating mechanical waves
  Method of controlling mechanical resonance hand
  Apparatus and method for suppressing mechanical resonance in a mass transit vehicle

Mechanical vibrations
Earthquake engineering
Resonance

ru:Резонанс#.D0.9C.D0.B5.D1.85.D0.B0.D0.BD.D0.B8.D0.BA.D0.B0
sv:Självsvängning